Manuel Tatasciore (born 17 April 1994 in Lanciano) is an Italian motorcycle racer.

Career statistics

Grand Prix motorcycle racing

By season

Races by year
(key)

External links

Living people
1994 births
Italian motorcycle racers
125cc World Championship riders
Moto3 World Championship riders
People from Lanciano
Sportspeople from the Province of Chieti